Humbertiella is a genus of praying mantids in the subfamily Gonypetinae found in Asia.

Species

The Mantodea Species File lists:
 Humbertiella affinis Giglio-Tos, 1917
 Humbertiella africana Rehn, 1912
 Humbertiella assimilata Wood-Mason, 1891
 Humbertiella brunneri Kirby, 1904
 Humbertiella ceylonica Saussure, 1869 - type species
 Humbertiella indica Saussure, 1869
 Humbertiella laosana Beier, 1930
 Humbertiella nada Zhang, 1986
 Humbertiella nigrospinosa Sjostedt, 1930
 Humbertiella ocularis Saussure, 1872
 Humbertiella similis Giglio-Tos, 1917
 Humbertiella sindhica Soomro, Soomro & Wagan, 2001
 Humbertiella taprobanarum Wood-Mason, 1891
 Humbertiella yunnanensis Wang & Bi, 1995

References

External links

Mantodea genera
Gonypetidae